Aşağıkaraören is a village in the District of Kazan, Ankara Province, Turkey.

References

Villages in Ankara Province
Neighbourhoods of Kazan